Mostyn is a surname, and may refer to:

David Mostyn (cartoonist), British comic artist
David Mostyn (British Army officer) (1928–2007), British Army officer
Francis Mostyn (archbishop of Cardiff)  (1860–1939), Roman Catholic prelate.
Francis Mostyn (Vicar Apostolic of the Northern District) (1800–1847), Roman Catholic prelate.
John Mostyn (governor) (1710–1779), British Army officer and colonial administrator
John Mostyn (music manager)
Matt Mostyn (born 1974), Irish-Australian rugby player
Sir Nicholas Mostyn, High Court Judge in the Family Division
Sir Pyers Charles Mostyn, 10th Baronet (1895–1917)
Sir Roger Mostyn, 3rd Baronet (1673–1739), Welsh politician
Savage Mostyn (c. 1713 – 1757), Royal Navy officer
Thomas Mostyn (fl. 1695-1697), pirate and slave trader sailing between New York and Madagascar
Thomas Lloyd-Mostyn (1830–1861), British politician

fr:Mostyn